Mohammad Akram (Urdu: محمد اکرم; born 10 September 1974) is a former Pakistani cricketer. He is the current Director of Cricket for the Pakistan Super League team Peshawar Zalmi.

He was a right-arm fast-medium bowler who played in 9 Test matches and 23 One Day International matches for Pakistan between 1995–1996 and 2000–2001.

Coaching career
On 24 August 2012 the Pakistan Cricket Board (PCB) appointed Mohammad Akram as their bowling coach on a one-year contract. In April 2013, Akram was also involved in a 10-day training camp for top fast bowlers with Wasim Akram at National Stadium Karachi.

References

External links
Official Surrey CCC website

1974 births
Living people
Allied Bank Limited cricketers
Essex cricketers
Northamptonshire cricketers
Pakistan One Day International cricketers
Pakistan Test cricketers
Pakistani cricketers
Pakistani emigrants to the United Kingdom
Rawalpindi cricketers
Surrey cricketers
Sussex cricketers
Cricketers from Islamabad
Pakistan Super League coaches
Pakistani cricket commentators
Pakistani cricket coaches
English cricket coaches
English cricketers